Richard Murphy may refer to:

Arts and entertainment
 Richard Murphy (screenwriter) (1912–1993), American film and television writer
 Richard Murphy (poet) (1927–2018), Irish poet
 Richard Murphy (architect) (born 1955), Scottish architect

Politics and law
 Richard L. Murphy (1875–1936), American Senator from Iowa
 Richard W. Murphy (born 1929), American diplomat
 Dick Murphy (Richard M. Murphy, born 1942), American politician, mayor of San Diego
 Rick Murphy, American politician, Arizona state senator

Sports
 Dick Murphy (basketball) (1921–1973), American basketball player
 Bos Murphy (Richard Murphy, 1924–2000), New Zealand boxer
 Dick Murphy (baseball) (born 1931), American baseball player
 Richard Murphy (rower) (born 1931), American Olympic rower
 Richard Murphy (American football) (born 1986), American football running back

Others
 Richard Murphy (sea captain) (1838–1916), American sea captain in Gloucester, Massachusetts
 Richard Murphy (marine ecologist) (born 1942), American marine ecologist
 Richard A. Murphy (born 1944), American neuroscientist
 Richard Murphy (tax campaigner) (born 1958), British campaigner and accountant
 Richard Murphy (police officer) (fl. 1999), American police officer, involved in shooting of Amadou Diallo